Ric Hochet is a Franco-Belgian comics series created by Tibet (drawings) and André-Paul Duchâteau (scripts). It first appeared on March 30, 1955, in the Franco-Belgian comics magazine Tintin.

Synopsis
The series features the adventures of Ric Hochet, a reporter for the newspaper La Rafale in Paris.

Characters
Ric Hochet
A journalist from Paris with a strong sense of justice who takes huge risks to see a culprit brought to justice. His first name "Ric" is a diminuitive; but while Duchâteau has stated that Ric's first name is "Frédéric", while Tibet has insisted on "Richard".
Commissaire Sigismond Bourdon
Ric's close friend and most important contact with the Paris police department.
Nadine
Bourdon's grandniece and later on Ric's girlfriend.
Richard Hochet
Ric's father, a former gentleman thief and fugitive from the police who appears sporadically in the series, mostly to help Ric (or for Ric to help him) out of sticky situations.  
Inspector Ledru
Bourdon's assistant, amd mostly a rival to Hochet and his superior. He later becomes the captain of an anti-terrorism unit.
Bob Drumond
First a journalist, later editor of La Rafale, and a close friend of Ric.
Professor Hermelin
A bad-tempered and cowardly but genius scientist with a dislike for Bourdon.
"Le Bourreau" ("The Executioner")/"B"
A sadistic, overweight spy for a foreign power and a long-term enemy of Ric. He is habitually exchanged for another prisoner to haunt his nemesis anew. After trying to get revenge in Ric by having him implicated for several murders, he finally dies in Dernier Duel when he gets shot with a blank cartridge by Ric.
Lambert
An unscrupulous journalist, formerly working for La Rafale before taking a new job at the rival newspaper agency Paris-Night. However, in tough cases he is able to provide Ric with essential informations.
Lamberto
A flamboyant, sensationalist Italian movie director.

Translations
The series' name deviated as translations were published across Europe, with the result that it is known as Rick Master in Germany, Rik Ringers in The Netherlands and Flanders, Riku Oksa in Finland and Allan Falk and Rick Hart in Scandinavia. Ric Hochet's stories were also published in South India in Tamil Language by Prakash Publishers. Ric Hochet is known as "Reporter Johnny" in Tamil. Ric Hochet's stories were published in Egypt in the Arabic version of the magazine Tintin (magazine) (تان تان), which was issued between 1971 and 1980.

Albums 

 Traquenard au Havre
 Mystère à Porquerolles
 Défi à Ric Hochet
 L'ombre de Caméléon 
 Piège pour Ric Hochet 
 Rapt sur le France 
 Suspense à la télévision 
 Face au serpent 
 Alias Ric Hochet 
 Les 5 revenants 
 Cauchemar pour Ric Hochet 
 Les spectres de la nuit 
 Les compagnons du diable
 Ric Hochet contre le Bourreau 
 Le monstre de Noireville 
 Requiem pour une idole 
 Épitaphe pour Ric Hochet
 Enquête dans le passé
 Les signes de la peur
 L'homme qui portait malheur 
 Alerte! Extra - Terrestres
 Le trio maléfique
 La ligne de mort
 La piste rouge 
 Coups de griffes chez Bouglione
 L'ennemi à travers les siècles
 L'épée sur la gorge
 Hallali pour Ric Hochet 
 Opération 100 milliards 
 Le fantôme de l'alchimiste 
 K.O. en 9 rounds (short stories)
 Tribunal noir 
 Le scandale Ric Hochet 
 La nuit des vampires 
 La mort noire 
 La flèche de sang 
 Le maléfice Vaudou 
 Face au crime 
 Le disparu de l'enfer 
 Le double qui tue 
 La maison de la vengeance 
 La liste mortelle 
 Les messagers du trépas 
 Ric Hochet contre Sherlock 
 Le triangle Attila 
 Les témoins de Satan 
 Les jumeaux diaboliques 
 Le secret d'Agatha 
 L'exécuteur des ténèbres 
 Le crime de l'an 2000 
 La bête de l'apocalypse 
 Le maître de l'illusion 
 Meurtre à l'Impro 
 Le masque de la terreur 
 Qui a peur d'Hitchcock 
 Un million sans impôt 
 L'heure du kidnapping 
 Premières armes (Reprinted)
 La main de la mort 
 Crime sur Internet 
 Le jeu de la potence 
 B.D. meurtres 
 La sorcière mal aimée 
 Le contrat du siècle 
 Panique sur le Web 
 Penthouse story 
 Le nombre maudit 
 Le collectionneur de crimes 
 L'homme de glace
 Silence de mort 
 La dernière impératrice 
 Le trésor des Marolles 
 On tue au théâtre ce soir
 Puzzle mortel 
 Code pour l'au-delà
 Dernier duel
 Ici, 77
 A la poursuite du griffon d'or

In popular culture

Ric Hochet is among the many Belgian comics characters to jokingly have a Brussels street named after them. The Galerie du Roi/ Koningsgalerij has a commemorative plaque with the name Rue Ric Hochet/ Rik Ringers Straat placed under the actual street sign.

In 1994, as part of the Brussels' Comic Book Route, a wall was designed in the Rue du Bon Secours/ Bijstandsstraat in Brussels. The wall was designed by G. Oreopoulos and D. Vandegeerde.

Sources

 Ric Hochet publications in Belgian Tintin and French Tintin BDoubliées 
 Ric Hochet albums Bedetheque 

Footnotes

External links
 Ric Hochet on Lombard website 
 L'Integrale Ric Hochet 
 A wall painting in Brussels 
 Tribute to Tibet

Bandes dessinées
1955 comics debuts
Hochet, Ric
Belgian comic strips
Belgian comics titles
Hochet, Ric
Lombard Editions titles
Hochet, Ric
Detective comics
Crime comics
Drama comics
Hochet, Ric
Hochet, Ric
Comics set in Paris
Comics set in France
Comics set in Belgium